Bayview is an upper middle class inner city suburb of Darwin, Northern Territory, Australia. It is bounded by Tiger Brennan Drive, the bay area and the Charles Darwin National Park. It is in the local government area of the City of Darwin.

History
Bayview is a shortened version of the estate name "Bayview Haven". It is believed to have been named because the area looks over Frances Bay. The suburb of Bayview is one of Darwins upmarket suburbs with house prices ranging from $600,000 to $1,500,000.

References

External links
Darwin map
Bayview: Suburb Profile

Suburbs of Darwin, Northern Territory